María Alejandra Marrero (born March 21, 1991), better known as Mariale, is a Venezuelan internet personality residing in Los Angeles, California. She is better known for hosting and producing the YouTube channels Mariale, SinPatuque and Mar ♥. She has a combined following of more than 18 million people just on YouTube.

In 2016 she received the Venezuelan Cacique de Oro award for best Venezuelan Influencer.

Internet career
Mariale started her YouTube career in January 2010 when she uploaded her first video to her YouTube Channel Makeuplocalypse, now known as Mariale. As of June 2010 she has uploaded more than 923 videos to this channel and has accumulated more than 11.8 million unique followers and more than 1.1 billion of total views.

In January 2011, Mariale started SinPatuque (meaning without makeup in Venezuelan slang), a personal vlog-style channel which slowly transitioned into its current daily vlogs form. As of June 2019, she has uploaded more than 150 videos to her channel and has accumulated more than 3.6 million followers and 25 million total views.

In November 2015, Mariale uploaded her first video in English to her newest channel, Mar ♥. As of June 2019, she has uploaded more than 280 videos to this channel and has accumulated more than 2 million unique followers and more than 62 million total views.

In April 2017, she launched her own lipstick line called "Mariale".

In August 2018, Mariale was the official Image of Smashbox Cosmetics' new collection "Ablaze" in all the ULTA stores around the world. Later that October, she launched her own E-clothing store called "Club Mar".

Mariale also holds a Bachelor of Science in Biology degree from Universidad Simón Bolívar.

Social media
As of June 2019, she has more than 5.9 million followers on Instagram, more than 1.7 million followers on Facebook. and more than 1 million followers on Twitter. This brings her total social media reach to more than 27 million followers.

Awards 
Mariale has been recognized by YouTube for her success with 6 different YouTube Play Buttons. A Silver Play button for reaching 100,000 subscribers in her Mariale, SinPatuque and Mar YouTube channels, as well as 3 Gold Play buttons for reaching 1 million followers in Mariale, SinPatuque and Mar and one Diamond button for reaching 10 million in Mariale.

References 

Living people
Spanish-language YouTubers
1991 births
Venezuelan YouTubers
Beauty and makeup YouTubers
Lifestyle YouTubers
YouTube vloggers
People from Caracas
Models from Los Angeles
Radio personalities from Los Angeles